Johannes "Hanne" Sobek (18 March 1900 – 17 February 1989) was a German international footballer.

Club career 
On club level he played for BTuFC Alemannia 90 and Hertha BSC. With Hertha he achieved the German football championship in 1930 and 1931.

International career 
Sobek won 10 caps for Germany national team between 1923 and 1931.

Coaching career 
He coached his former club Hertha between 1959 and 1963.

References

External links
 
 
 

1900 births
1989 deaths
Association football midfielders
German footballers
Germany international footballers
Hertha BSC players
Hertha BSC managers
German football managers
People from Mirow
Footballers from Mecklenburg-Western Pomerania